Elihu Bailey was a member of the Wisconsin State Assembly.

Biography
Bailey was born on December 15, 1817 in Warren Township, Belmont County, Ohio. In 1856, he settled in Marshall, Richland County, Wisconsin. He was a preacher of the Methodist Episcopal Church and a teacher.

Political career
Bailey was a Republican member of the Assembly during the 1861, 1871, 1877 and 1879 sessions. Additionally, Bailey was Chairman (similar to Mayor) of Marshall and a justice of the peace. In 1860, he was a candidate for Clerk of Richland County, Wisconsin. Previously, he had been a candidate for the Ohio General Assembly on multiple occasions as a member of the Liberty Party.

References

People from Belmont County, Ohio
People from Richland County, Wisconsin
Republican Party members of the Wisconsin State Assembly
Mayors of places in Wisconsin
American justices of the peace
Ohio Libertyites
American Methodist clergy
Religious leaders from Wisconsin
Schoolteachers from Wisconsin
1817 births
Year of death missing
Activists from Ohio
Educators from Ohio